KIOP (88.3 FM) was a radio station licensed to Prague, Oklahoma, United States. The station was owned by St. Wenceslaus Catholic Church of Prague, Oklahoma

KIOP broadcast a Catholic Religious format to the Prague, Oklahoma, area.

History
This station was assigned call sign KIOP on September 3, 2009.

KIOP's license was cancelled by the Federal Communications Commission on June 2, 2021 for failure to file a license renewal application.

References

External links
okcr.org

IOP
Catholic radio stations
Radio stations established in 2012
2012 establishments in Oklahoma
Defunct radio stations in the United States
Radio stations disestablished in 2021
2021 disestablishments in Oklahoma